Avner Golasa (1957 – 24 August 2020) was an Israeli professional footballer who played for Hapoel Kfar Saba as a midfielder.

Golasa was born in Kfar Saba, Israel, to a Mizrahi Jewish family from Yemen. He was the father of Roei Golasa, Eyal Golasa, and Orel Golasa, all of whom have become professional footballers as well.

Honours

With Hapoel Kfar Saba
Israeli Championships
Winner (1): 1981–82
State Cup
Winner (2): 1974–75, 1979–80

References

1957 births
2020 deaths
Israeli Mizrahi Jews
Israeli footballers
Hapoel Kfar Saba F.C. players
Liga Leumit players
Association football midfielders
Footballers from Kfar Saba
Israeli people of Yemeni-Jewish descent